Timothy P. Murphy is an American law enforcement officer and a former Deputy Director of the Federal Bureau of Investigation. Murphy joined the FBI in September 1988. He has formerly served in FBI field posts in cities such as Newark, Tampa, Washington, DC, and Cincinnati along with several post at FBI Headquarters. Murphy has investigative experience in a number of matters including counterterrorism, organized crime and drug trafficking. His experience also expands into undercover and surveillance work. Murphy's executive experience includes being the special agent in charge of the Washington Field Office, special agent in charge of the Cincinnati Division, and a member of the Director's Special Agent in Charge Advisory Committee.

Murphy graduated from Ferris State University. He retired as Deputy Director of the FBI on August 31, 2011.

Currently, Murphy is CEO of Consortium Networks  and serves on the Board of Directors for Apifiny, Western Union, and the nonprofit National Center for Missing and Exploited Children.

References

Deputy Directors of the Federal Bureau of Investigation
Living people
Year of birth missing (living people)
Ferris State University alumni